Tobias Berggren (22 January 1940 – 8 June 2020) was a Swedish poet. He made his literary debut in 1969. Among his later collections are Namn och grus from 1973 and Fält och legender from 1997. He was awarded the Dobloug Prize in 1992.

References

1940 births
2020 deaths
Swedish poets
Swedish male writers
Writers from Stockholm
Dobloug Prize winners
Swedish male poets